Imaging informatics, also known as radiology informatics or medical imaging informatics, is a subspecialty of biomedical informatics that aims to improve the efficiency, accuracy, usability and reliability of medical imaging services within the healthcare enterprise. It is devoted to the study of how information about and contained within medical images is retrieved, analyzed, enhanced, and exchanged throughout the medical enterprise.

As radiology is an inherently data-intensive and technology-driven specialty, those in this branch of medicine have become leaders in Imaging Informatics. However, with the proliferation of digitized images across the practice of medicine to include fields such as cardiology, ophthalmology, dermatology, surgery, gastroenterology, obstetrics, gynecology and pathology, the advances in Imaging Informatics are also being tested and applied in other areas of medicine. Various industry players and vendors involved with medical imaging, along with IT experts and other biomedical informatics professionals, are contributing and getting involved in this expanding field.

Imaging informatics exists at the intersection of several broad fields:
biological science – includes bench sciences such as biochemistry, microbiology, physiology and genetics
clinical services – includes the practice of medicine, bedside research, including outcomes and cost-effectiveness studies, and public health policy
information science – deals with the acquisition, retrieval, cataloging, and archiving of information
medical physics / biomedical engineering – entails the use of equipment and technology for a medical purpose
cognitive science – studying human computer interactions, usability, and information visualization
computer science – studying the use of computer algorithms for applications such as computer assisted diagnosis and computer vision

Areas of interest
Key areas relevant to Imaging informatics include:
Picture archiving and communication system (PACS) and component systems
Imaging informatics for the enterprise
Image-enabled electronic medical records
Radiology Information Systems (RIS) and Hospital Information Systems (HIS)
Digital image acquisition
Image processing and enhancement
Radiomics
Image data compression
3D visualization and multimedia
Speech recognition
Computer-aided diagnosis (CAD).
Imaging facilities design
Imaging vocabularies and ontologies
Data mining from medical images databases
Transforming the Radiological Interpretation Process (TRIP)
DICOM, HL7, FHIR and other standards
Workflow and process modeling and process simulation
Quality assurance
Archive integrity and security
Teleradiology
Radiology informatics education
Digital imaging

Training
In the US and some other countries, Radiologists who wish to pursue sub-specialty training in this field can undergo fellowship training in imaging informatics. Medical Imaging Informatics Fellowships are done after completion of Board Certification in Diagnostic Radiology, and may be pursued concurrently with other sub-specialty radiology fellowships.

The American Board of Imaging Informatics (ABII) also administers a certification examination for Imaging Informatics Professionals. PARCA (PACS Administrators Registry and Certification Association) certifications also exist for imaging informatics professionals.

The American Board of Preventive Medicine (ABPM) offers a certification examination for Clinical Informatics for physicians who have primary board certification with the American Board of Medical Specialties, a medical license and a medical degree. There are two pathways to be eligible to sit for the examination: Practice Pathway (open through 2022) for those who have not completed ACGME-accredited fellowship training in Clinical Informatics and ACGME-Accredited Fellowship Pathway of at least 24 months in duration.

References

External links
The Society for Imaging Informatics in Medicine
American Board of Imaging Informatics

Bioinformatics